Retro Atari Classics is a collection of Atari video games for the Nintendo DS developed by American studio Taniko and released in 2005 by Atari. The game features classic Atari games as well as updated versions.

Included titles 

The collection includes the following ten games:
 Pong 
 Breakout
 Asteroids
 Centipede
 Gravitar
 Lunar Lander
 Missile Command
 Sprint
 Tempest
 Warlords

References 

2005 video games
Nintendo DS games
Nintendo DS-only games
Atari video game compilations
Video games scored by Allister Brimble
Video games developed in the United States